Acacia linarioides is a shrub belonging to the genus Acacia and the subgenus Juliflorae that is native to north Australia.

Description
It has dark grey coloured bark that has a smooth texture and glabrous angular branchlets. Like most species of Acacia it has phyllodes rather than true leaves. It blooms between January and July producing golden flowers. The curved and twisted seed pods that form after flowering are constricted between and raised over the seeds.

Distribution
It is endemic to the top end of the Northern Territory and on a few of the islands in the Gulf of Carpentaria where it is found in crevices and on plateaux, alongside creeks and among rocks in thin sandy sandstone based soils.

See also
List of Acacia species

References

linarioides
Flora of the Northern Territory
Taxa named by George Bentham
Plants described in 1842